William Henry Williams (1910–1999) was a British production manager and producer.

Select credits
Assassin for Hire (1951) - production manager
Mystery Junction (1951) - producer
Wide Boy (1952) - producer
Crow Hollow (1952) - producer
The Floating Dutchman (1952)
 Counterspy (1953) - producer
The Shadow Man (1953) - producer
 Dangerous Voyage (1954) - producer

References

External links
William H. Williams at TCMDB
William H Williams at IMDb

1910 births
1999 deaths
British film producers